Willy Jansson (born 13 May 1927) is a Norwegian politician for the Labour Party.

Jansson was born in Sandar. He was elected to the Norwegian Parliament from Vestfold in 1969, but was not re-elected in 1973. He had previously served as a deputy representative during the terms 1961–1965 and 1965–1969. From May 1968 he served as a regular representative, filling in for Johan Andersen who had died.

On the local level he was a member of Sandefjord municipality council from 1955 to 1971.

References

1927 births
Living people
Members of the Storting
Labour Party (Norway) politicians
Vestfold politicians
People from Sandefjord
20th-century Norwegian politicians